Theo Geisel (born 24 August 1948 in Limburg an der Lahn, Hesse) is a German physicist. Geisel is a director at the Max Planck Institute for Dynamics and Self-Organization and professor of theoretical physics at the University of Göttingen. His research is primarily concerned with the behavior of complex systems ranging from theoretical investigations in quantum chaos to nonlinear phenomena occurring in the brain.

Biography
Geisel studied physics in Frankfurt and Regensburg. After graduating from the University of Regensburg in 1975, he worked as Post-Doc at the Max Planck Institute for Solid State Research in Stuttgart (1976–77) and at the Xerox Palo Alto Research Center (1978–79). In 1980, he returned to Regensburg as assistant professor. During 1983-87 he worked as a Heisenberg fellow, later he became professor for theoretical physics at the University of Würzburg (1988–89) and the University of Frankfurt (1989–96). During this time, he was awarded the prestigious Gottfried Wilhelm Leibniz Prize. Since 1996, he has been professor for theoretical physics at the University of Göttingen and Director of the Max Planck Institute for Dynamics and Self-Organization. He is chairperson of the Bernstein Center for Computational Neuroscience (BCCN) Göttingen which he founded in 2005. Since 2013, Theo Geisel is member of the Göttingen Academy of Science, the oldest continually existing such institution in Germany.

Personal life
Geisel is also a classical and jazz musician and performs regularly on flute and saxophone. He has recorded a jazz album with the band August Stockinger's Flohzirkus.

Main areas of research
Theo Geisel is known for fundamental research on nonlinear and stochastic dynamics with applications in a broad range of complex living and non-living systems. He is leading in transferring methods between fields, including randomly appearing motion known in chaos theory to solid state physics, pattern formation theory established for fluids to the analysis of neural circuits, the discovery of new mathematical objects called unstable attractors in neuronal models and recently concepts from the physics of nano-structures to the predictability of tsunami waves.

Nonlinear Dynamics
Computational neuroscience
Forecast of epidemics
Lévy walks (anomalous diffusion)
Dynamics of neuronal networks
Development of cortical maps
Neural synchronization
Quantum chaos
Semiconductor nanostructures

Awards and fellowships
Heisenberg Fellow of the Deutsche Forschungsgemeinschaft (German Research Foundation) 1983
Gottfried Wilhelm Leibniz Prize 1994
Fellow of the American Physical Society 2008
Gentner-Kastler Prize 2009

Editorial boards
Physical Review Letters (Divisional Associate Editor for Biological Physics)
Chaos - Interdisciplinary Journal of Nonlinear Science (American Institute of Physics)

References

External links

1948 births
Living people
People from Limburg an der Lahn
20th-century German physicists
Gottfried Wilhelm Leibniz Prize winners
Max Planck Society people
Academic staff of the University of Göttingen
University of Regensburg alumni
Theoretical physicists
Fellows of the American Physical Society
21st-century German physicists
Max Planck Institute directors